North Crowley High School is a public high school in Fort Worth, Texas. It administers grades 9-12 and is part of the Crowley Independent School District.

The school's colors are royal blue and silver. The school's mascot is the Panther. The school is often colloquially referred to by its nickname, "NoCro," a short form of the full school name. The North Crowley Men's basketball team were Texas 5A State Champions in 2008. In 2003, they were Texas 4A Football State Champions.

Activities

The school offers a variety of extracurricular activities. Active student organizations include American Sign Language Club, Army Junior Reserve Officers' Training Corps, Band, Blue Crew, Choir, Computer Science Club, French Club, Future Business Leaders of America, Future Farmers of America, Key Club, Masters of the Universe (Science Club), Spanish Club, Speech/Debate, Student Council, Texas Future Music Educators, Thespians. Athletics programs offered include Athletic Trainer, Baseball, Cheerleading, Cross Country, Football, Golf, Men's Basketball, Men's Soccer, Powerlifting, Softball, Swimming, Tennis, Volleyball, Women's Basketball, Women's Soccer, and Women's Track. Fine Arts programs offered include Art, Mighty Panther Band, Choir, and Theater Arts.

Academics

The school offers Advanced Placement (AP) classes in a number of subjects, and the AP exams may be taken at the end of the school year. Pre-AP and honors classes are also offered. Students may also opt for dual-enrollment at area universities, simultaneously earning high school and university credit. The academic curriculum also includes opportunities for vocational training in a variety of areas, for students who elect to take these classes for elective credit.   The school participates in the AVID program, and encourages eligible students to participate in the Duke Talent Identification Program (TIP). The school maintains a chapter of the National Honor Society, and inducts new members based on academic performance and community involvement.

Notable alumni 

 Kyan Anderson, basketball player (TCU Horned Frogs, Okapi Aalstar, medi Bayreuth, Élan Béarnais, KB Prishtina, BG Göttingen, Falco KC, currently for Gießen 46ers)
Jason Curtis Fox, American football player (Miami Hurricanes, Detroit Lions, Miami Dolphins) 
 Keith Langford, basketball player (Kansas Jayhawks, San Antonio Spurs, Austin Toros, Fort Worth Flyers, Kansas Cagerz, Gruppo Triboldi, Angelico Biella, Virtus Bologna, BC Khimki, Maccabi Tel Aviv, Olimpia Milano, BC UNICS, Shenzhen Leopards, Maccabi Rishon Lezion, Panathinaikos, AEK Athens)
 Kevin Langford, basketball player (Cal Golden Bears, TCU Horned Frogs, Paderborn Baskets, Debreceni Vadkakasok, Navarra, Kolossos Rodou, Panionios, PAOK, Paris-Levallois, Antwerp Giants, Instituto, Koroivos, KTP Basket, Charilaos Trikoupis)
 Kelvin Lewis, basketball player (Auburn Tigers, Houston Cougars, Texas Legends, Rio Grand Valley Vipers, Solna Vikings, Pyrintö, BC Timișoara, Kolossos Rodou, Höttur, Kauhajoki Karhu, currently for SKN St. Pölten) 
 Norense Odiase, basketball player (Texas Tech Red Raiders, Northern Arizona Suns/Motor City Cruise, Brose Bamberg, Science City Jena)
 Brittainey Raven, basketball player (Texas Longhorns, Atlanta Dream) 
 Cyril Richardson, American football player (Baylor Bears, Buffalo Bills, Chicago Bears, San Antonio Commanders, Seattle Dragons) 
 Grant Sherfield, basketball player (Wichita State Shockers, currently for the Nevada Wolf Pack)
E. J. Speed, American football player (Tarleton State Texans, currently for the Indianapolis Colts)
 Willie Warren, basketball player (Oklahoma Sooners, Los Angeles Clippers, Bakersfield Jam, Rio Grande Valley Vipers, Maccabi Rishon LeZion, Szolnoki Olaj, Virtus Bologna, Chongqing Fly Dragons, Zhejiang Golden Bulls, Petrochimi, Shanxi Brave Dragons, Texas Legends, Al Riyadi Club Beirut)

References

External links
North Crowley High School Official Website

Crowley Independent School District high schools
Public high schools in Fort Worth, Texas